Arryn Siposs (born 25 November 1992) is an Australian professional American football punter for the Philadelphia Eagles of the National Football League (NFL). He is a former professional Australian rules footballer who played for the St Kilda Football Club in the Australian Football League (AFL). He later switched codes to play college football for Auburn in the United States. He has Hungarian roots.

AFL career
Siposs was drafted by St Kilda with the 75th selection in the 2010 AFL draft from the Dandenong Stingrays in the TAC Cup.  He was originally from Beaconsfield and played in the South East Juniors where he kicked 99 goals in his under 16s year. Playing in the TAC Cup for the Stingrays he kicked 34 goals in 2010.

Siposs made his debut against  in round 7 of the 2011 AFL season. He was substituted on in the second half of the match and had four disposals and kicked one goal. The Saints lost by three points (81–84). He was then named in the squad to play against  in round 16 but was later made an emergency. Toward the end of the season, he suffered shin splints.

He was delisted at the conclusion of the 2015 season.

American football career

College career
In November 2017, Siposs received an offer from Auburn University. He visited Auburn the following month and committed to play for the college football team as a punter. He had also been training with ProKick Australia, to transition from Australian rules to American football. Siposs competed for the starting punter position behind Aiden Marshall, prior to the start of the 2018 season, and was later named as backup to Marshall. However, Siposs was on the field more than Marshall against the Washington Huskies, and head coach Gus Malzahn opted to make Siposs the starting punter against the Alabama State Hornets.

Professional career

Detroit Lions
On 25 April 2020, Siposs signed with the Detroit Lions at the end of the 2020 NFL Draft as an undrafted free agent. He was placed on the reserve/COVID-19 list by the Lions on 29 July 2020, and was activated 10 days later. He was waived on 5 September 2020 and signed to the practice squad the next day. He was released on 21 October 2020 and re-signed to the practice squad three days later. He was released from the practice squad again on 16 December 2020, and re-signed to the practice squad again on 19 December 2020.

Philadelphia Eagles
On 13 January 2021, Siposs signed a reserve/futures contract with the Philadelphia Eagles.

Siposs made his NFL debut with the Eagles on 12 September 2021 against the Atlanta Falcons. In the 2021 season, Siposs recorded 55 punts for 2,416 yards for a 43.93 average.

During the 2022 season, Siposs injured his ankle in Week 14 and was placed on injury reserve. He recorded 44 punts for 2,005 total yards for a 45.57 average. He recovered in time to play in Super Bowl LVII against the Kansas City Chiefs.  In Super Bowl LVII, Siposs kicked two punts. His second punt, occurring in the 4th quarter with the Eagles trailing by one point, was a low line drive that went in the wrong direction from where the gunners were positioned. Kadarius Toney took advantage and returned the punt to the five-yard line setting up a Kansas City touchdown. The Chiefs went on to win Super Bowl LVII by 3 points.

References

External links

Philadelphia Eagles bio
Auburn Tigers bio

Living people
1992 births
Australian people of Greek descent
Australian people of Hungarian descent
St Kilda Football Club players
Sandringham Football Club players
Australian rules footballers from Victoria (Australia)
Dandenong Stingrays players
Williamstown Football Club players
Auburn Tigers football players
Australian players of American football
Footballers who switched code
American football punters
Detroit Lions players
Philadelphia Eagles players
Australian rules football players that played in the NFL